Elevate your sole is a multi-channel retailer, specialising in the sale of footwear. The largest independent multi-branded footwear retailer in North Wales, operating from three stores and a 1500 sqft warehouse.

Established in 2013, the first store of this family owned business was opened in Prestatyn by proprietor Hal Holmes-Pierce. A second larger store opened in Rhos on Sea and was officially opened by the Mayor and Mayoress of Colwyn Bay on 3 September 2016. Recent expansion has seen a move into bigger premises in Prestatyn and taking over the reigns of Simon Baker Shoes in Llandudno on 1 July 2019.

Awards and achievements 
Runner up in High Street Favourites in ‘Fashion, health & beauty’ (as part of High Street Heroes Awards 2016).

Charity 
elevate your sole was the first business in Wales to partner up with charity 'Shoe Aid’, who are engaged in reducing shoe poverty and preventing footwear going to landfill.

Notable people 
Hal Holmes-Pierce (proprietor) is currently Chair of Prestatyn Business Forum (as of 2 November 2020). A 'Highly Commendable Runner Up’ in the High Street Heroes Awards 2016. Also part of the Small Biz 100.

References

Conwy County Borough
Shoe companies of the United Kingdom
British companies established in 2013